William M. George (also known as Bill George) (January 27, 1865 – August 23, 1916)  was a professional baseball player for the New York Giants and the Columbus Solons. He played with the Giants from 1887 to 1889, and played one year with the Columbus Solons of the American Association in 1889. He was born on January 27, 1865, in Bellaire, Ohio, and he died on August 23, 1916, in Wheeling, West Virginia. He is buried in the Mount Calvary Cemetery in Wheeling, West Virginia. He batted right-handed and threw left-handed.

External links

1865 births
1916 deaths
Major League Baseball pitchers
Major League Baseball outfielders
Baseball players from Ohio
New York Giants (NL) players
Columbus Solons players
Springfield Senators players
Wheeling National Citys players
Wheeling Nailers (baseball) players
Portland Gladiators players
Helena (minor league baseball) players
Portland Webfeet players
Montgomery Colts players
Mobile Blackbirds players
Savannah Electrics players
Savannah Rabbits players
Grand Rapids Rippers players
Grand Rapids Gold Bugs players
St. Paul Apostles players
St. Paul Saints (Western League) players
Norfolk Jewels players
Newark Colts players
Wheeling Stogies players
People from Bellaire, Ohio
19th-century baseball players